Motori (English: Motorcycles) is the third studio album by the Yugoslav and Bosnian heavy metal band Divlje Jagode. The album was recorded at Music Paark Studio in Bad Homburg vor der Höhe, Germany and was released in September 1982. It is considered the band's breakthrough album and it sold around 500,000 copies. The song "Ne želiš kraj" was written by former vocalist Ante "Toni" Janković, who previously left the group due to musical differences and was replaced by Alen Islamović. Janković joined the band on stage during the tour in support of the album.

Track listing
All music written by Sead Lipovača. All lyrics written by Alen Islamović, except where noted.

Personnel
Sead Lipovača - lead guitar
Alen Islamović - lead vocals, bass
Nasko Budimlić - drums

Production
Theo Werdin - producer
Ulli Werdin - assistant producer
Mišo Rodić - executive producer
Erol Čolaković - photography, artwork

References

External links
Motori at Discogs
Motori at Encyclopaedia Metallum

1982 albums
Alen Islamović albums
Divlje jagode albums